United Nations Security Council Resolution 197, adopted unanimously on October 30, 1964, after examining the application of the Republic of Zambia for membership in the United Nations, the Council recommended to the General Assembly that the Republic of Zambia be admitted.

See also
List of United Nations Security Council Resolutions 101 to 200 (1953–1965)

References
Text of the Resolution at undocs.org

External links
 

 0197
 0197
 0197
1964 in Zambia
October 1964 events